The Schauspielhaus Zürich is one of the most prominent and important theatres in the German-speaking world. It is also known as "Pfauenbühne" (Peacock Stage). The large theatre has 750 seats.

History
It served initially as a music hall or vaudeville stage. In 1901 the building was rented by the director of the Zürich Opera House and opened as a play house with Goethe's comedy  (The Accomplices). From 1903 until 1926 the play house was run by a private cooperative.

In 1926 Zürich wine wholesaler and play house director Ferdinand Rieser acquired the house and had it renovated. When the lease ran out in 1952, the citizens of Zürich refused to purchase the house for the proposed price of 3 million Swiss francs.

However, the effort to establish an ambitious theater in Zürich met with little success at first, and until 1933 the theater was rarely thought of outside of Switzerland.

After the rise of the Nazis in 1933, however, many important actors and directors immigrated to Switzerland from Germany and Austria. With the help of these artists, the theater achieved great success, staging many anti-fascist works, importantly the world-premiers of several plays by Bertolt Brecht.

After the war, the theater retained its important place in world and German-language theater. During this time it saw world premiers of such important playwrights as Max Frisch, Friedrich Dürrenmatt, Carl Zuckmayer, Georges Schehadé, Botho Strauß and Yasmina Reza.

Established in 1959, the Theater am Hechtplatz served for a short time as a second stage.

From 2000 to 2004 the theater experienced with Christoph Marthaler as director a new artistic blooming and was chosen as theater of the year twice by Theater heute (Theater Today), the most important and widely read German theater publication.

Since summer 2009  is headed by Barbara Frey. The house's repertoire spans the whole history of theatre literature, from the old Greek up to the first performances of contemporary plays.

Directors 

 
 
 
 
 
 
 
 
 
 
 
 
 
 
 
 
 since 2019: Nicolas Stemann and  Benjamin von Blomberg

Further reading

References

External links

 Schauspielhaus Zürich

Theatres in Zürich
Tourist attractions in Zürich
Culture of Zürich